Newfoundland, as a separate British colony, produced its own decimal currency between 1865 and 1947. The coins of Newfoundland are of historical importance as Newfoundland was a British colony until 1907, and a Dominion until 1949, when Newfoundland and Labrador became the tenth province of Canada.

Traders' tokens

Rutherford brothers 
The first Newfoundland traders' tokens were Halfpenny tokens issued by brothers Robert & I.S. Rutherford in St John's in 1840–41. There are two varieties of the tokens – a dated type and an undated type.

In 1846, after a fire destroyed the St. John's store, two additional Rutherford Brothers (George and Andrew) opened a new store in Harbour Grace and issued a second set of tokens, inscribed RUTHERFORD BROS.  These pieces were minted by Ralph Heaton & Sons of Birmingham, England (commonly known as Heaton's Mint).  These pieces are unique in one respect – they have the 'RH' mintmark above the date.

The Peter M'Auslane farthing 
Another early Newfoundland traders' token was issued in the 1840s by Peter M'Auslane, a general merchant in St John's.  Following the same 1846 St. John's fire which destroyed his business, he left Newfoundland and settled in Upper Canada (now Ontario).

The obverse of this very rare piece is inscribed 'PETER M'AUSLANE St. JOHNS NEWFOUNDLAND', and the reverse is inscribed 'SELLS ALL SORTS OF SHOP & STORE GOODS'.

Anonymous issues 
These pieces do not bear either an issuer's name or a place name.  There were two issues of these pieces:  a Halfpenny dated 1858 and a Halfpenny dated 1860.

The 1858 Halfpenny token, which is very rare, has a ship on the obverse similar to the Ship Halfpenny tokens from Prince Edward Island. The date 1858 alone appears across the centre of the reverse.

The 1860 Halfpenny token, which is scarce has the date 1860 in the centre of the obverse inside a circle. The inscription FISHERY RIGHTS FOR NEWFOUNDLAND is enclosed outside the inner circle. The reverse of this piece is inscribed RESPONSIBLE GOVERNMENT going around the outside and AND FREE TRADE is in the centre of the reverse. This piece makes a political statement on promoting the fishing industry and asserting a claim to responsible government.

Newfoundland dollar coinage (1865–1947)

In 1865, Newfoundland changed over to decimal currency following the footsteps of Canada, New Brunswick, and Nova Scotia. Pattern coins were issued in 1864, as were specimen cents.

Newfoundland was the only British North American colony to have its own gold coin (though the Ottawa mint also produced gold sovereigns). Originally, a gold dollar was considered, but it was decided it might be lost by the fishermen due to its small size. Thus, a two-dollar denomination was chosen for the gold coin. Three (equivalent) denominations were indicated on the coin, as it was denominated as $2, 200 cents, and 100 pence (equivalent value in sterling).

One thing that differentiates the later versions of the dollar coins is that they feature the crowned Percy Metcalfe effigy of King George VI. Usually, this portrait is used for Crown colonies such as Hong Kong, Malaya, or India, whereas for normal Canadian coins, an uncrowned effigy of the King by Thomas Humphrey Paget is used.

Complete type set of Newfoundland dollar coinage

References

Footnotes

Notes

Works cited

Coins of Canada by J.A. Haxby & R.C. Willey.

Coins of Newfoundland
Currencies of Canada
Currencies of North America
Dominion of Newfoundland
Economy of Newfoundland and Labrador